Hansjörg Schlager (20 August 1948 in Langenau – 10 March 2004 in Titisee-Neustadt) was a German alpine skier who competed in the 1972 Winter Olympics.

External links
 sports-reference.com

1948 births
2004 deaths
People from Langenau
Sportspeople from Tübingen (region)
German male alpine skiers
Olympic alpine skiers of West Germany
Alpine skiers at the 1972 Winter Olympics
20th-century German people